The Other Side of Heaven is a 2001 American adventure drama film written and directed by Mitch Davis, based on John H. Groberg's first autobiography, In the Eye of the Storm. The film stars Christopher Gorham as John Groberg and Anne Hathaway as Jean Groberg (née Sabin).

The film showcases Groberg's experiences as a missionary of the Church of Jesus Christ of Latter-day Saints (LDS Church) in the Tongan islands in the 1950s.

Plot
During the 1950s, John Groberg (Gorham) graduates from Brigham Young University and is called on a 3-year mission to Tonga. Throughout the film, Groberg and his fiancée, Jean (Hathaway), exchange letters monthly. After a long journey across the Pacific, Groberg arrives in Tonga and is sent to a group of very remote islands. He is assigned a native Tongan companion, Feki (Joe Folau). As a new missionary, he struggles with learning the language; he studies it intensely and learns more about Tongan culture.

Groberg encounters a number of obstacles in his mission. One night, he forgets instructions to cover his feet, and rats bite his soles while he is asleep. A local Christian minister warns the people not to listen to Groberg and Feki. Later, he sends four men to beat them. However, one of the men, Tomasi, prevents the attack. Groberg learns from the drunken Tomasi that he had been baptized a member of the LDS Church many years ago as a boy. Tomasi later begins attending church meetings. When a young boy falls out of a mango tree and becomes unconscious, Groberg gives him basic first aid and prays for him. When a young woman, at the behest of her family, attempts to seduce Elder Groberg, he responds by teaching her about marriage. A typhoon destroys trees, homes, and crops. People die in the storm, and many die due to starvation and dehydration. Groberg is close to dying himself when the local minister gives him the last of his food. After the supply boat finally arrives, the minister is found dead. Later, while traveling at sea, Groberg and his two counselors are caught in a large storm. He is washed overboard and fears for his life. He swims until he finds an island where he also locates his counselors, and they are later rescued and return to Tonga.

Groberg returns to his hut one day to find that his mission president has come to visit the island. He is unhappy because he has not heard from Groberg since he came to the island many months prior. Groberg describes some of the success they have experienced, and the president is shocked to learn of new branches and meeting places on outer islands that have not been authorized. Groberg and his counselors spend the entire night filling out the church records the president requested. In the morning, he finds the president is about to board a boat, and gives him a large sheaf of forms documenting all they have accomplished. When his time as a missionary comes to an end, Groberg receives a telegram instructing him to return to New Zealand where he will travel to Idaho Falls, Idaho. When he is ready to depart, many islanders gather in their best clothing to see him off, testifying to the impact he has had during his stay. Once he arrives in Idaho, he marries Jean and the two spend their honeymoon in a cottage by a beach.

Cast
 Christopher Gorham as John H. Groberg
 Anne Hathaway as Jean Sabin
 Joe Folau as Feki
 Nathaniel Lees as Kelepi
 Miriama Smith as Lavinia
 Alvin Fitisemanu as Tomasi
 Pua Magasiva as Finau
 John Sumner as President Stone

Production

Development
Director Mitch Davis was inspired by John H. Groberg's autobiography, In the Eye of the Storm, and wanted to tell Groberg's story via film. Deseret Book (at the time, Bookcraft) owned the rights, and the company wanted to ensure that Davis captured the "spirit of the book". John Groberg consented for the movie to be made after meeting Davis, and then the rights were secured. Producer Gerald R. Molen is noted for his work on films such as The Color Purple, Schindler's List, and The Lost World: Jurassic Park. The film's budget was $7 million.

Casting
Christopher Gorham was cast in the lead role as John Groberg. Mitch Davis selected him after auditioning "hundreds and hundreds of actors on both coasts" because Gorham exhibited "a little light in his eyes", according to Davis. He has since become a common name in Mormon cinema, appearing in other LDS roles with films such as We Love You, Sally Carmichael! and the sequel to Heaven, where he reprises the role of John Groberg. Anne Hathaway was cast as Jean Groberg (née Sabin). Hathaway stated that she liked how the character of Jean was committed to Groberg but lived her own life. Before filming her parts of Heaven in New Zealand, she auditioned for The Princess Diaries.

Filming
The real John and Jean Groberg gave feedback on the script. Jean Groberg provided Davis with the letters she and John exchanged, and they were used in filming the scenes where John and Jean write to one another.

The film was shot on location in Auckland, New Zealand and the island of Rarotonga, capital of the Cook Islands. All of the filming equipment and necessary supplies had to arrive by boat. The island scenes were completed in two months. In both Rarotonga and Auckland, rain often threatened to delay shoots, but Davis claimed that his prayers delayed much rain while filming.

Release
Disney produced, advertised, and distributed The Other Side of Heaven. Hathaway's The Princess Diaries was also released in 2001.

The film opened theatrically on December 14, 2001, in two venues, earning $55,765 in its opening weekend, ranking number 41 in the domestic box office. By the end of its run, almost a year later, on December 2, 2002, the film grossed $4,720,371 domestically and $39,643 overseas for a worldwide total of $4,760,014.

Critical reception
The film received negative reviews from critics. Review aggregation website Rotten Tomatoes reports a 29% approval rating based on 42 reviews, with an average rating of 4.6 out of 10. The site's consensus states: "The Other Side of Heaven preaches to the converted; others will likely consider it simplistic, even offensive, propaganda." On Metacritic, the film has a 38 out of 100 rating based on 16 critics, indicating "generally unfavorable reviews".

Professor of literature Terryl Givens noted that the film doesn't mention Groberg's faith or explain why he is serving his mission. He speculates that this could be an effort to "universalize the message of Christian service and spiritual coming of age".

Sequel
In February 2018, Davis announced that filming was starting for a sequel titled The Other Side of Heaven 2: Fire of Faith. Gorham, Folau, Lees, and Smith reprised their roles from the first film. Natalie Medlock played Jean Groberg, replacing Hathaway. The movie was based on Groberg's second autobiographical novel, with the same title, set ten years after the first film. The story follows John returning to the island with his wife and five daughters during the period of time he served as an LDS Church mission president. It was released June 28, 2019. On Rotten Tomatoes the film has an approval rating of 71% based on reviews from 7 critics.

References

External links
 
Materials related to The Other Side of Heaven, approximately 2000-2002, L. Tom Perry Special Collections, Harold B. Lee Library, Brigham Young University
 
 
 
 

2000s adventure drama films
2001 films
American adventure drama films
American independent films
Films about Mormonism
Films produced by Gerald R. Molen
Films scored by Kevin Kiner
Films set in Idaho
Films set in Los Angeles
Films set in the 1950s
Films set in Tonga
Films shot in New Zealand
Films shot in the Cook Islands
Mormon cinema
Latter Day Saints in popular culture
Mormonism and Pacific Islanders
The Church of Jesus Christ of Latter-day Saints in Tonga
Walt Disney Pictures films
Works about Mormon missionaries
2001 drama films
Harold B. Lee Library-related 21st century articles
2000s English-language films
2000s American films